Ibaté is a municipality in the state of São Paulo, Brazil with a population of 35,472 in 2020 according to IBGE. The city's name comes from the Tupi language and means "dry lake".

Ibaté is located on the east-center of the state, 12 km from São Carlos and 247 km from the city of São Paulo.

History
The origins and development of the city has relation with the coffee production on the region, at the end of the 19th century. The village of São João Batista da Lagoa was founded on January 29, 1893. In 1900 the village was elevated to district, with the name of Vila de Ibaté.

On December 30, 1953, Ibaté was officially established as a municipality.

References

Municipalities in São Paulo (state)
1893 establishments in Brazil